Ezekiel Turner (born June 9, 1996) is an American football linebacker for the Arizona Cardinals of the National Football League (NFL). He played college football at Washington as a defensive back and was signed by the Cardinals as an undrafted free agent following the 2018 NFL Draft. Turner was named to the PFWA All-Rookie Team as a special teamer in the 2018 NFL season.

Collegiate career

Washington Huskies 

Turner enrolled at the University of Washington in January, 2015 and played as a defensive back for the Washington Huskies his remaining college career.

Turner was named Huskies Special Teams Player of the Week four different times in his college career and selected as the co-winner of the Special Teams MVP in the 2016 season.

2015 season 
Turner played 12 of 13 games and started one game in his sophomore season. Turner got his first start versus Stanford University, where he had a total of seven tackles.

2016 season 
Tuner played in 13 of 14 games during his junior season. Turner had a tackle for loss and had an interception in the 2016 Pac-12 Football Championship Game vs. the Colorado Buffaloes.

Selected as the co-winner of the Special Teams MVP award following his junior season after totaling 23 total tackles, 2.5 tackles for a loss and one forced fumble.

2017 season 
Turner played all 13 games and started three games during his senior season. Turner totaled five tackles, including one tackle for a loss, in his season opener against the Rutgers.

Turner totaled six tackles and a 41-yard interception return against the Washington State Cougars in the 110th Annual Apple Cup and was named special teams player of the week.

College statistics 

Sources:

Professional career

2018 season 
Turner signed with the Arizona Cardinals as an undrafted free agent on April 30, 2018. He played in all 16 games, finished third in the league with 16 total special teams tackles, and was named to the PFWA All-Rookie Team as a special teamer.

2020 season 
On September 13, 2020, in the season opener, Turner blocked a punt against San Francisco 49ers' punter Mitch Wishnowsky in the first-quarter. Turner's teammate Dennis Gardeck recovered and advanced the ball five yards to the 49ers' 10-yard line.

On December 20, 2020, in Week 15, Turner blocked a punt against Philadelphia Eagles' punter Cameron Johnston in the first-quarter. The ball bounced out of bounds at the Eagles' 6-yard line, which ended the Eagles' drive on a turnover on downs. In the fourth-quarter, on fourth-and-2, Turner caught a 26-yard reception from his punter Andy Lee on a successful fake punt  resulting in a first-down for the Cardinals.

2021 season
The Cardinals placed a restricted free agent tender on Turner on March 15, 2021. He signed the one-year contract on April 19. He was placed on injured reserve on October 13, 2021 with a shoulder injury. He was activated on January 17, 2022.

2022 season
On March 18, 2022, Turner re-signed with the Cardinals.

2023 season
On March 15, 2023, Turner signed a one-year contract extension with the Cardinals.

NFL statistics

Regular season 

Sources:

References

External links
 Washington profile
  Arizona Cardinals profile

1996 births
Living people
American football linebackers
American football safeties
Arizona Cardinals players
People from Pasadena, Maryland
Players of American football from Maryland
Sportspeople from Anne Arundel County, Maryland
Washington Huskies football players